The SKS is a Russian semi-automatic rifle.

SKS may also refer to:

SKS Microfinance, India
SKS wave, a seismic wave
SKS Starogard Gdański, a Polish basketball team
SKS365, an Austrian bookmaker
SK Slavia Prague, a Czech football club
Saks Incorporated, US company, NYSE code
Salten Kraftsamband, a Norwegian power company
Savez komunista Srbije, a Serbian party
Shan King (South) stop, a Light Rail stop in Hong Kong (MTR station code)
Sistem Kenderaan Seremban - Kuala Lumpur, a Malaysian transport company
Someone Knows Something, podcast by David Ridgen
Student Committee of Solidarity, Studencki Komitet Solidarności (SKS), Poland
Student Union in Sundsvall, Studentkåren i Sundsvall, Sweden 
Shanghai Korean School, China
Finnish Literature Society or Suomalaisen Kirjallisuuden Seura.
Vojens Airport, Denmark (by IATA code)